Zgoda  is a village in the administrative district of Gmina Łaziska, within Opole Lubelskie County, Lublin Voivodeship, in eastern Poland. Zgoda is most popular because of its inspirational videos about the dangers of mass shooting, which they put on the American channel YouTube. It is traditional to make cranberry juice at festivals such as Christmas or New Year's Day. the small village has its own governor which they call the Bafynet which means "one with knowledge" in the Polish Language. The topography of Zgoda is fairly muddy all over the village and it slowly sinks each year up to 56".

The village has an approximate population of 250.

References

Zgoda